Attheyella is a genus of copepods in the family Canthocamptidae, containing the following species:

Attheyella aculeata (Thiébaud, 1912)
Attheyella africana Brady, 1907
Attheyella alaskaensis M. S. Wilson, 1958
Attheyella aliena Noodt, 1956
Attheyella alta Shen & Sung, 1965
Attheyella americana (Herrick, 1884)
Attheyella amurensis Borutsky, 1936
Attheyella antillica Petkovski, 1973
Attheyella arctica (Lilljeborg, 1902)
Attheyella arequipensis Ebert, 1976
Attheyella asymetrica Ebert, 1976
Attheyella australica G. O. Sars, 1908
Attheyella baikalensis Borutsky, 1930
Attheyella bennetti (Brehm, 1928)
Attheyella biarticulata Löffler, 1962
Attheyella bicolor C. B. Wilson, 1932
Attheyella bidens (Schmeil, 1893)
Attheyella borutzkyi Smirnov, 1930
Attheyella brasiliana Ebert, 1976
Attheyella brasiliensis Ebert, 1976
Attheyella brehmi Chappuis, 1929
Attheyella broiensis Reid, 1994
Attheyella bromelicola Ebert, 1976
Attheyella bryobiota Ebert, 1976
Attheyella bullata Ebert & Noodt, 1975
Attheyella byblis Chang & H. S. Kim, 1992
Attheyella calamensis Ebert, 1976
Attheyella camposi Ebert & Noodt, 1975
Attheyella capensis Ruhe, 1914
Attheyella carolinensis Chappuis, 1932
Attheyella caroliniana Coker, 1926
Attheyella chilensis Ebert & Noodt, 1975
Attheyella ciliata Löffler, 1962
Attheyella cingalensis Brady, 1886
Attheyella clavigera Harding, 1955
Attheyella coiffaiti Chappuis, 1958
Attheyella cordillierica Dussart, 1984
Attheyella coreana Miura, 1969
Attheyella coronata G. O. Sars, 1904
Attheyella crassa (G. O. Sars, 1863)
Attheyella crenulata (Mrázek, 1901)
Attheyella cryptorum Brady, 1880
Attheyella curacautensis Ebert, 1976
Attheyella cuspidata (Schmeil, 1893)
Attheyella dadayi (Chappuis, 1924)
Attheyella decorata (Daday, 1901)
Attheyella dentata (Poggenpol, 1874)
Attheyella derelicta (Brian, 1927)
Attheyella dogieli (Rylov, 1923)
Attheyella duthiei T. Scott, 1896
Attheyella ekmani Kiefer, 1933
Attheyella elaphoides Ebert, 1976
Attheyella ensifer (Delachaux, 1918)
Attheyella farellonensis Ebert, 1976
Attheyella ferox (Delachaux, 1919)
Attheyella fimbriata (Brehm, 1950)
Attheyella fluviatilis Chappuis, 1931
Attheyella freyi Löffler, 1963
Attheyella frigida Willey, 1925
Attheyella fuhrmanni (Thiébaud, 1912)
Attheyella gessneri Chappuis, 1956
Attheyella gladkovi Borutsky, 1952
Attheyella godeti Jakobi, 1959
Attheyella goeldii Ebert, 1976
Attheyella gracilis (G. O. Sars, 1863)
Attheyella grandidieri (Guerne & Richard, 1893)
Attheyella guyanensis (Delachaux, 1924)
Attheyella hannae (Kiefer, 1926)
Attheyella heterospina Shen & Tai, 1964
Attheyella hirsuta Chappuis, 1951
Attheyella horvathi (Chappuis, 1924)
Attheyella huaronensis (Delachaux, 1918)
Attheyella humidarum M. H. Lewis, 1972
Attheyella idahoensis (Marsh, 1903)
Attheyella ilami Dumont & Maas, 1988
Attheyella illinoisensis (S. A. Forbes, 1876)
Attheyella incae (Brehm, 1936)
Attheyella incerta (Brehm, 1950)
Attheyella inconstans Harding, 1955
Attheyella inopinata Chappuis, 1931
Attheyella insignis (Delachaux, 1918)
Attheyella jureiae Por & Hadel, 1986
Attheyella kalima (Delachaux, 1924)
Attheyella koenigi Pesta, 1928
Attheyella koepkei Ebert, 1976
Attheyella laciniata Ebert & Noodt, 1975
Attheyella lacustris Chappuis, 1931
Attheyella lanata (Mrázek, 1901)
Attheyella lanceolata (Delachaux, 1918)
Attheyella levigata Löffler, 1962
Attheyella lewisae Wells, 2007
Attheyella macandrewae T. & A. Scott, 1895
Attheyella maorica (Brehm, 1928)
Attheyella marina Gurney, 1927
Attheyella maxima (Delachaux, 1918)
Attheyella meridionalis Dussart, 1982
Attheyella mervini Janetzky, Martínez Arbizu & Reid, 1996
Attheyella minuta Chappuis, 1931
Attheyella mongoliana Shen & Chang, 1966
Attheyella montana Ebert, 1976
Attheyella morimotoi Miura, 1962
Attheyella multisetosa Ebert, 1976
Attheyella multispinosa Ebert, 1976
Attheyella muscicola (Chappuis, 1928)
Attheyella nakaii (Brehm, 1927)
Attheyella naphtalica Por, 1983
Attheyella natalis Brady, 1904
Attheyella nebulosa Ebert, 1976
Attheyella nepalensis Löffler, 1968
Attheyella nivalis Willey, 1925
Attheyella noodti Ebert, 1976
Attheyella nordenskioldii (Lilljeborg, 1902)
Attheyella northumbrica (Brady, 1880)
Attheyella northumbricoides Willey, 1925
Attheyella nuda Löffler, 1962
Attheyella obatogamensis (Willey, 1925)
Attheyella oculata Löffler, 1963
Attheyella oculta Ebert, 1976
Attheyella orientalis Chappuis, 1929
Attheyella orinocoensis Dussart, 1984
Attheyella ornata Löffler, 1962
Attheyella osmana (Kiefer, 1955)
Attheyella palustris (Brady, 1880)
Attheyella paranaphtalica Pesce & Galassi, 1988
Attheyella paucisetosa Chang & H. S. Kim, 1992
Attheyella pauliani (Chappuis, 1954)
Attheyella peruana Ebert, 1976
Attheyella phytobiotica Ebert, 1976
Attheyella pichilafquensis Löffler, 1961
Attheyella picola Ebert, 1976
Attheyella pilagaensis Janetzky, Martínez Arbizu & Reid, 1996
Attheyella pilosa Chappuis, 1929
Attheyella propinqua T. Scott, 1893
Attheyella pygmaea (G. O. Sars, 1863)
Attheyella quatuorspinosa Ebert, 1976
Attheyella quillehuensis Löffler, 1961
Attheyella quinquespinosa Shen & Tai, 1964
Attheyella reducta Chappuis, 1958
Attheyella rhaetica (Schmeil, 1893)
Attheyella rotoruensis M. H. Lewis, 1972
Attheyella ruttneri Chappuis, 1931
Attheyella salvadorica Ebert, 1976
Attheyella salvatoris (Brehm, 1950)
Attheyella salviniae Ebert, 1976
Attheyella sancarlensis (O. Rocha & Matsumura-Tundisi, 1976)
Attheyella santaremensis Ebert, 1976
Attheyella schindleri Kiefer, 1957
Attheyella septemarticulata Ebert, 1976
Attheyella serrata Löffler, 1962
Attheyella silvestris Ebert, 1976
Attheyella silvicola Löffler, 1973
Attheyella singalensis Brady, 1886
Attheyella siolii (Kiefer, 1967)
Attheyella sphagnobiotica Ebert, 1976
Attheyella spinipes Reid, 1987
Attheyella spinosa Brady, 1880
Attheyella stachanovi Borutsky, 1952
Attheyella stillicidarum M. H. Lewis, 1972
Attheyella striblingi (Reid, 1990)
Attheyella subarctica Willey, 1925
Attheyella tasmaniae Chappuis, 1951
Attheyella tetraspinosa Chang, 1993
Attheyella triangulata Ebert, 1976
Attheyella trigonura (Ekman, 1905)
Attheyella trispinosa (Brady, 1880)
Attheyella ussuriensis Rylov, 1932
Attheyella vera Por & Hadel, 1986
Attheyella vietnamica Borutsky, 1967
Attheyella vivianii Ebert & Noodt, 1975
Attheyella warreni Brady, 1913
Attheyella wiegoldi (Brehm, 1923)
Attheyella wierzejskii (Mrázek, 1893)
Attheyella wieseri Rouch, 1962
Attheyella willeyi Kiefer, 1929
Attheyella wulmeri (Kerhervé, 1914)
Attheyella wulmeroides Borutsky, 1931
Attheyella yemanjae Reid, 1994
Attheyella yesoensis Ishida, 1993
Attheyella yunnanensis Shen & Tai, 1979
Attheyella zschokkei (Schmeil, 1893)

References

Harpacticoida
Taxonomy articles created by Polbot